Michele Lazazzera (born 24 January 1968) is an Italian sprinter. He competed in the men's 100 metres at the 1988 Summer Olympics.

References

1968 births
Living people
Athletes (track and field) at the 1988 Summer Olympics
Italian male sprinters
Olympic athletes of Italy
Place of birth missing (living people)